= MV Asakaze =

History

Panama
- Name: Asakaze
- Port of registry: Panama City, Panama
- Completed: 2014
- Identification: IMO number: 9691187; MMSI number: 371930000; Callsign: H8MO
- Status: In service

General characteristics
- Class & type: General Cargo Ship
- Type: Single Decker
- Tonnage: 7,193 GT; 11,382 DWT
- Length: 120.93 metres (396.8 ft)
- Beam: 20 metres (66 ft)
- Draught: 4.9 metres (16 ft)
- Decks: 1
- Speed: 13.6 kn

Asakaze is a general cargo vessel, registered in Panama City. The container ship delivers cargo around the Asia-Pacific area, including China, South Korea and Vietnam.

== Description ==
The single-deck ship was built in 2014, and measures 120.93 metres (396.8 ft) by 20 metres (66 ft) with a gross tonnage of 7,193 tonnes.
